Charles Willis (cricketer) (1827–1895), English amateur cricketer
 Charles T. Willis (1841–1921), New York politician
 Charles Willis, pseudonym of Arthur C. Clarke (1917-2008), British science and science fiction author
 Charles F. Willis (1918–1993), assistant to Dwight D. Eisenhower
 Charles Willis, one of The Willis Brothers, a country music ensemble